The 2020–21 Illinois Fighting Illini women's basketball team represented the University of Illinois during the 2020–21 NCAA Division I women's basketball season. The Fighting Illini, led by fourth-year head coach Nancy Fahey, played their home games at State Farm Center as members of the Big Ten Conference. Due to the COVID-19 pandemic in the United States, they played fewer non-conference games than in previous seasons; three games were originally postponed and later canceled due to the pandemic. They finished the season 5–18, 2–16 in Big Ten play to finish in thirteenth place. They lost in the second round of the Big Ten women's tournament to Northwestern. Their first round win against Wisconsin was the first Big Ten tournament victory in coach Fahey's tenure at Illinois.

Previous season

The Illini finished the 2019–20 season 11–19, 2–16 in Big Ten play to finish in 13th (of 14) place. They lost in the first round of the Big Ten women's tournament to Wisconsin.

Roster

Schedule and results
Due to the COVID-19 pandemic, games were played without an audience, or with very limited attendance.

|-
!colspan="9" style=| Non-conference regular season

|-
!colspan="9" style=| Big Ten conference season

|-
!colspan="9" style=| Big Ten Women's Tournament

Rankings

See also
2020–21 Illinois Fighting Illini men's basketball team

References

Illinois Fighting Illini women's basketball seasons
Illinois
Fight
Fight